The Ministry of Shipping and Insular Policy is a government department of Greece.

History
It was founded as the Mercantile Marine Ministry in 1936. On 19 September 2007, it was merged with the Ministry for the Aegean and Island Policy to form the Mercantile Marine, Aegean and Island Policy Ministry. The latter was abolished on 7 October 2009 and the shipping portfolio fell under the new Ministry of the Economy, Competitiveness and Shipping. It was re-established as the Ministry of Maritime Affairs, Islands and Fisheries on 30 September 2010, but was again abolished on 27 June 2011 and merged with the Ministry of Regional Development and Competitiveness to form the Ministry of Development, Competitiveness and Shipping. It was re-established as the Ministry of Shipping and the Aegean ) on 21 June 2012, but was again abolished on 26 January 2015 and merged into the Ministry of the Economy, Infrastructure, Shipping and Tourism. On 23 September 2015, it was re-established as the Μinistry of Shipping and Island Policy in the Second Cabinet of Alexis Tsipras. The incumbent minister is Ioannis Plakiotakis in the Cabinet of Kyriakos Mitsotakis.

List of Mercantile Marine Ministers

List of Ministers for Mercantile Marine, the Aegean and Island Policy (2007–2009)

List of Ministers for Maritime Affairs, Islands and Fisheries (2010–2011)

List of Ministers for Shipping and the Aegean (2012–2015)

List of Alternate Ministers for Shipping and the Aegean (January–September 2015)

List of Ministers for Shipping and Insular Policy (since September 2015)

See also
Ministry for Naval Affairs (Greece)

External links
Official website, in Greek

References

Shipping
Shipping
Greek Merchant Marine
Greece
Transport organizations based in Greece
Shipping in Greece
Shipping ministries